Five Houses may refer to:

Five Houses, Isle of Wight
Five Houses, Colchester County, Nova Scotia
Five Houses, Lunenburg County, Nova Scotia
Five Houses of Chán